High Bridge Reformed Church is a historic church located at Church Street and County Route 513 in High Bridge in Hunterdon County, New Jersey. The church, built in 1870, is part of the Reformed Church in America. It was added to the National Register of Historic Places on November 21, 1980, for its significance in architecture and religion.

See also
 National Register of Historic Places listings in Hunterdon County, New Jersey

References

External links
 

High Bridge, New Jersey
Reformed Church in America churches in New Jersey
Churches on the National Register of Historic Places in New Jersey
Churches completed in 1870
19th-century Reformed Church in America church buildings
Churches in Hunterdon County, New Jersey
National Register of Historic Places in Hunterdon County, New Jersey
New Jersey Register of Historic Places